EDCA may refer to:

Enhanced Defense Cooperation Agreement, a mutual defense agreement between the United States and the Philippines
Enhanced Distributed Channel Access, an operation mode of IEEE 802.11e-2005
 E.D.Ca., an abbreviation used for the United States District Court for the Eastern District of California
 Escadron de détection et de contrôle aéroporté, a French Air and Space Force aircraft squadron